The 1998–99 Tulsa Golden Hurricane men's basketball team represented the University of Tulsa as a member of the Western Athletic Conference in the 1998–99 college basketball season. The Golden Hurricane played their home games at the Reynolds Center. Led by second-year head coach Bill Self, they finished the season 23–10 overall and 9–5 in conference play to finish tied atop the WAC Mountain division standings. After losing in the semifinals of the 1999 WAC men's basketball tournament, the team an at-large bid to the NCAA tournament as No. 9 seed in the East region. The Golden Hurricane beat College of Charleston in the opening round before falling to No. 1 overall seed and eventual National runner-up Duke in the second round.

Roster

Schedule and results

|-
!colspan=9 style=| Regular Season

|-
!colspan=9 style=| WAC Tournament

|-
!colspan=9 style=| NCAA Tournament

Rankings

Awards and honors
Bill Self – WAC Coach of the Year

References

Tulsa Golden Hurricane men's basketball seasons
Tulsa
Tulsa Golden Hurricane men's b
Tulsa Golden Hurricane men's b
Tulsa